is a South Korean footballer.

Club statistics
Updated as of 23 February 2018.

References

External links

1991 births
Living people
Sportspeople from Jeju Province
South Korean footballers
Association football defenders
J1 League players
J2 League players
Sanfrecce Hiroshima players
Shimizu S-Pulse players
Zweigen Kanazawa players
Ventforet Kofu players
Seoul E-Land FC players
K League 2 players
South Korean expatriate footballers
South Korean expatriate sportspeople in Japan
Expatriate footballers in Japan